Cuphodes diospyrosella is a moth of the family Gracillariidae. It is known from Japan. The wingspan is 7.0–8.5 mm. Leaf miners, the diospyrosella larvae feed on the mesophyll of the Diospyros species.

References

Cuphodes
Leaf miners
Moths of Japan
Moths described in 1957